Potamogeton confervoides, common names pondweed, alga-like pondweed, algae-like pondweed, and Tuckerman's pondweed is a species of plant found in North America. It is listed as endangered in Connecticut, as a special concern in Maine, as threatened in Massachusetts, New York (state), Pennsylvania, and Wisconsin. It is listed as historical in Rhode Island.

References

confervoides